The rivière Felton is a tributary of Grand lac Saint François which constitutes the head lake of the Saint-François River. The course of the "Felton River" crosses the territory of the municipality of Saint-Romain, in the Le Granit Regional County Municipality (MRC), in the administrative region of Estrie, on the South Shore of the St. Lawrence River, in Quebec, Canada.

Geography 

The main neighboring hydrographic slopes of "Felton river" are:
 north side: Grand lac Saint François, Baie Sauvage;
 east side: Noire River (Felton River tributary), brook Rouge;
 south side: Sauvage River (Felton River tributary), Blanche River (Felton River tributary);
 west side: Legendre River.

The Felton River rises at the confluence of the Noire River and Blanche River, in the southern part of the Municipality of Saint-Romain.

The Felton River constitutes the demarcation between the municipality of Saint-Romain and Stornoway. In addition, this river constitutes the eastern limit of Parc national de Frontenac. The Felton River flows onto the south shore of Baie Sauvage which is an extension of Grand lac Saint François.

Toponymy 

The term "Felton" is a family name of English origin. This term also refers to municipalities in United Kingdom, United States and Canada.

The toponym "Rivière Felton" was officially registered on December 5, 1968, at the Commission de toponymie du Québec.

References

See also 

 Saint-François River, a stream
 Sauvage River, a stream
 Noire River, a stream
 Blanche River, a stream
 Legendre River, a stream
 Grand lac Saint François, a body of water
 Le Granit Regional County Municipality (MRC)
 Saint-Romain, a municipality
 Stornoway, a municipality
 Parc national de Frontenac, a protected area
 List of rivers of Quebec

Le Granit Regional County Municipality
Rivers of Estrie